Reichenbach may refer to:

Places

Austria 
 Reichenbach (Litschau), a part of Litschau
 Reichenbach (Rappottenstein), a part of Rappottenstein

Germany 
 Reichenbach (Oberlausitz), in Niederschlesischer Oberlausitzkreis district, Saxony
 Reichenbach im Vogtland, in Vogtlandkreis district, Saxony
 Reichenbach am Heuberg, in Tuttlingen district, Baden-Württemberg 
 Reichenbach an der Fils, in Esslingen district, Baden-Württemberg 
 Reichenbach, Upper Palatinate, in Cham district, Bavaria
Reichenbach Abbey (Bavaria), Benedictine monastery in Reichenbach
 Reichenbach, Upper Franconia, in Kronach district, Bavaria
 Reichenbach, Thuringia in Saale-Holzland district, Thuringia
 Reichenbach, Birkenfeld, in Birkenfeld district, Rhineland-Palatinate
 Reichenbach (Hornberg), in the Black Forest, Baden-Württemberg
 Reichenbach-Steegen in Kaiserslautern district, Rhineland-Palatinate
 Reichenbach, a part of Hessisch Lichtenau, Hesse
 Reichenbach, a part of Lautertal (Odenwald), Hesse
 Reichenbach (Waldbronn), a part of Waldbronn, Baden-Württemberg
 Oberreichenbach, Baden-Württemberg, a town in the district of Calw, Baden-Württemberg
 Oberreichenbach, Bavaria, a town in the district of Erlangen-Höchstadt, Bavaria
 Oberreichenbach (disambiguation), various additional meanings
 Unterreichenbach, a town in the district of Calw, Baden-Württemberg

Rivers 
 Reichenbach (Kahl), Bavaria, tributary of the Kahl
 Reichenbach (Kocher), Baden-Württemberg, tributary of the Kocher
 Reichenbach (Liederbach), Hesse, upper course of the Liederbach
 Reichenbach (Zahme Gera), Thuringia, tributary of the Zahme Gera

Italy 
 Reichenbach Castle, in Merano, South Tyrol

Poland 

Switzerland 
 Reichenbach (Oberhasli), or Reichenbachtal, an alpine valley in Oberhasli, Canton of Berne
 Reichenbach Falls, a series of waterfalls on the River Aar near Meiringen in Bern canton
 Reichenbach im Kandertal, a municipality in the Frutigen-Niedersimmental administrative district in the Canton of Bern
 Reichenbach Castle, in Zollikofen in the Canton of Bern

Other uses
 Reichenbach (crater)
Reichenbach (surname)
"Reichenbach" (Supernatural), an episode of Supernatural

See also
 "The Reichenbach Fall", an episode of Sherlock